Gəgiran (also, Gegeran & Gegiran) is a village and municipality in the Lankaran Rayon of Azerbaijan. It has a population of 1,925. The municipality consists of the villages of Gəgiran, Diryan and Jidi.

References 

Populated places in Lankaran District